Troy Weaver (born March 1, 1968) is an American basketball executive. He is the current general manager for the Detroit Pistons of the National Basketball Association (NBA)

Early life
Weaver attended Archbishop Carroll High School in Washington, D.C. He then attended Prince George's Community College, where he played one season of basketball in 1991.

Coaching career
Prior to his collegiate coaching career, Weaver co-founded the DC Assault of the Amateur Athletic Union (AAU) in 1993. He served as the coach of DC Assault from 1993 to 1996, where he amassed an 85–17 record, and helped lead the team to the 1996 AAU Tournament of Champions.

Weaver served as assistant coach for the Pittsburgh Panthers from 1996 until 1999. He then served as assistant coach for the New Mexico Lobos during the 1999–2000 season. Weaver served as assistant coach for Syracuse from 2000 to 2004. The 2003 Syracuse Orangemen won the 2003 NCAA National Championship, led by Carmelo Anthony, who was recruited by Weaver.

NBA executive

Utah Jazz
Weaver served as the head scout for the Utah Jazz from 2004 until 2007. He was promoted to director of player personnel of the Jazz for the 2007–08 season.

Oklahoma City Thunder
On May 9, 2008, Weaver was named assistant general manager for the Oklahoma City Thunder. In his first season with the Thunder in 2008, Weaver pushed for drafting Russell Westbrook with the No. 4 overall pick in the draft, when at the time, Westbrook wasn't projected as an elite recruit. On August 31, 2010, Weaver was promoted to vice president/assistant general manager for the Thunder. He most recently served as vice president of basketball operations during the 2019–20 season.

Detroit Pistons
On June 18, 2020, Weaver was named the general manager for the Detroit Pistons.

References

1968 births
Living people
Detroit Pistons executives
National Basketball Association general managers
New Mexico Lobos men's basketball coaches
Oklahoma City Thunder executives
Pittsburgh Panthers men's basketball coaches
Syracuse Orange men's basketball coaches
Utah Jazz executives
Utah Jazz scouts